Kim Yoon-ji (English name: Christine Kim; Hangul: 김윤지) is a Korean-American singer in South Korea. She performs under the stage name NS Yoon-G (Hangul: NS윤지) and debuted in 2009 with the digital single "Head Hurts" under JTM Entertainment. She is now with VAST Entertainment. The "NS" in her name initially stood for "New Spirit", but was later changed to "New Star". Kim used her Korean name as a part of her stage name as she found "Christine" too difficult for Korean people to pronounce.

Early life
Kim was born in Seoul, South Korea on September 6, 1988 and moved to the San Fernando Valley in California in the 4th grade. She entered UCLA, majoring in Dance and Communication, but took a leave of absence after a year to pursue her career in entertainment in South Korea. 
After initially joining DSP Media as a trainee, she debuted with JTM Entertainment with a single "Head Hurts".

Kim's cousin is Kara member Kang Ji-young; she also has a younger brother.

Career
She recorded the English version of "You Make Me Happy" for Fresh Pretty Cure! around 2009.

On November 1, 2012, Kim released a digital single, "If You Love Me" featuring Jay Park, and released an official music video and a behind the scenes making film. Kim performed her single on Korean music shows such as KBS' Music Bank, Mnet's M! Countdown, MBC's Music Core and SBS' Inkigayo, alongside Jay Park who was occasionally replaced by Dalmatian's Simon.

Also in November 2012, Kim became the host of K-pop Tasty Road with U-KISS's Eli Kim, which combined the Korean Wave and food into one show.

In January 2013, Kim performed in Ho Chi Minh City alongside Adam Lambert and Aurea.

In 2021, Kim announced she was re-releasing her 2012 single "If You Love Me", which would feature Joohoney, replacing Jay Park's original feature on the song.

On December 3, 2021, it was reported that Kim had signed with Sublime Artist Agency. later Sublime Artist Agency confirmed that the contract was officially signed.

In 2021, Kim Yoon Ji, along with her husband, Choi Woo-sung, joined the couple-featuring English-subtitled SBS Korean variety show, Same Bed, Different Dreams 2, starting with episode 220, and continues to make guest or featured appearances on the show in 2022.

Due to be released in 2023, South Korean singer-actress Kim Yoon Ji was cast in Netflix's upcoming comic heist film 'Lift' starring American comedian Kevin Hart. In a recent episode of Same Bed Different Dreams 2, NS Yoon revealed after returning to Korea after filming "Lift" that she plans to begin having children with her husband, Choi Woo-sung.

Personal life 
Kim Yoon Ji (stage name: NS-Yoon) began dating musician Chancellor in March 2015 while working on music together. They had met two years prior to the relationship. The couple became estranged due to their conflicting schedules and ended their relationship in August 2017. In September 2021, Kim married a businessman, the son of comedian  and singer . Her husband, Choi Woo-sung, the son of her late father's best friend, Lee Sang-hae, was her childhood friend and first boyfriend. They reunited as adults after having parted amicably as teenagers, still deeply in love, because they had assumed that their best-friend fathers might object to their dating. Their decades-long love story with its happy ending is featured in the English-subtitled SBS Korean variety show, Same Bed, Different Dreams 2, beginning with episode 220. In a recent episode of Same Bed Different Dreams 2, NS Yoon revealed after returning to Korea after filming the Netflix comic heist, "Lift", starring American comedian Kevin Hart, that she plans to begin having children with her husband, Choi Woo-sung.

Discography

Extended plays

Single albums

Singles

As lead artist

As featured artist

Videography

Music videos

Music video appearances

Filmography

Film

Television series
The Last Empress (SBS, 2018)
Mine (tvN, 2021)

Variety show
 SBS Star King (2010–11)
 KBS2 100 Points Out of 100 (2010)
 Arirang TV Pops in seoul (2011) – VJ of the show
 MBC 2011 Idol Star Athletics Championships (2011)
 Mnet K-pop Tasty Road (2012) – co-hosted with U-KISS's Eli Kim.
 tvN Saturday Night Live Korea (2012) – the highest rated episode of the season, aired December 1, hosted by Jay Park
 MBC Every 1 Singles 2 (2013)
 KBS World World Date with SHINee (2013)
 JTBC Crime Scene (2014)
 KBS2 Safety First! (2014)
 SBS Same Bed, Different Dreams 2 (2017), beginning with episode 220 in 2021 and ongoing appearances in 2022

References

External links

 

South Korean female idols
South Korean women pop singers
Living people
American musicians of Korean descent
1988 births
21st-century South Korean singers
21st-century South Korean women singers